In some of Canada's provinces census divisions are equivalent to counties. They may also be known by different names in different provinces, or in different parts of provinces. The below table shows the largest and smallest census division in Canada and the provinces and territories by area and by population.

By area

By population

10 fastest growing population (2006–2011)
Division No. 16, Alberta 27.2%
La Jacques-Cartier RCM, Quebec 24.0%
Mirabel RCM, Quebec 21.2%
Division No. 2, Manitoba 17.0%
Les Moulins RCM, Quebec 15.8%
York RM, Ontario 15.7%
Vaudreuil-Soulanges RCM, Quebec 15.7%
Division No. 3, Manitoba 14.4%
Halton RM, Ontario 14.2%
Les Moulins RCM, Quebec 13.8%

10 fastest shrinking population (2006–2011)
Kenora, Ontario −10.6%
Guysborough County, Nova Scotia −10.1%
Northern Rockies Regional Municipality, British Columbia −9.3%
Division No. 3, Newfoundland and Labrador −7.8%
Division No. 9, Newfoundland and Labrador −7.2%
Shelburne, Nova Scotia −6.7%
Victoria County, Nova Scotia −6.3%
La Haute-Côte-Nord RCM, Quebec −6.2%
Inverness, Nova Scotia −5.7%
Témiscouata RCM, Quebec −5.6%

References

Census divisions of Canada